Paul Thomas Salata (October 17, 1926 – October 16, 2021) was an American professional football player who was a wide receiver in the National Football League (NFL), All-America Football Conference (AAFC) and Western Interprovincial Football Union (WIFU). He was born to a Serbian-born father and second generation Serbian-American mother. After his college football days at USC Salata played for the AAFC/NFL's  San Francisco 49ers (1949–1950) and the AAFC's Baltimore Colts (1950). After the Colts franchise folded in 1950 he was declared draft-eligible and was subsequently drafted in the tenth round of the 1951 NFL Draft by the Pittsburgh Steelers. He scored the 49ers final touchdown in the All-American Football Conference, as well as the team's first TD in NFL. He also played three final seasons in Canada including in 1952 with the Calgary Stampeders, where he was an all-star, and in 1953 with the Ottawa Rough Riders.

In later years, Salata became known for creating the Mr. Irrelevant Award in the NFL Draft, awarded annually to the last overall pick in the year's draft. After retiring from football, he joined his family's Southern California construction business. He has also acted in a number of Hollywood movies. He played Tony Minelli in Angels in the Outfield (1951) and appeared, uncredited, in the 1953 film Stalag 17 as a prisoner.

Salata died on October 16, 2021, one day before his 95th birthday. He was buried at Pacific View Memorial Park.

References

1926 births
2021 deaths
American football ends
Baltimore Colts (1947–1950) players
Burials at Pacific View Memorial Park
Calgary Stampeders players
Ottawa Rough Riders players
San Francisco 49ers players
USC Trojans baseball players
USC Trojans football players
Players of American football from Los Angeles
American people of Serbian descent
Male actors from Los Angeles
Players of Canadian football from Los Angeles